Brian Douglas Thure (born September 3, 1973) is a former American football offensive tackle in the National Football League for the Washington Redskins.  He played college football at the University of California and was drafted in the sixth round of the 1995 NFL Draft.

1973 births
Living people
Sportspeople from Downey, California
American football offensive tackles
California Golden Bears football players
Players of American football from California
Washington Redskins players